In molecular biology, Adaptive response 33 (adapt33)  is a long non-coding RNA. It was originally identified in hamster fibroblast cells. Its expression is induced by oxidative stress.

See also
 Long noncoding RNA

References

Non-coding RNA